Lestock is both a placename, a surname and a forename, and may refer to one of the following:

As a surname
 Richard Lestock, Royal Navy officer.

As a forename
 Lestock Adams, English cricketer
 Lestock Robert Reid, Governor of Mumbai, India
 Lestock Graham DesBrisay, Canadian businessman
 Lestock P. W. DesBrisay, Canadian businessman

As a place
 Lestock, Saskatchewan, a Canadian village.